Anthony John Robinson (born 22 July 1925 – 24 July 1982) was a British field hockey player who competed in the 1952 Summer Olympics and 1956 Summer Olympics.

Robinson won the bronze medal at the 1952 Summer Olympics in field hockey.

External links
 
sports-reference.com

1925 births
1982 deaths
British male field hockey players
Olympic field hockey players of Great Britain
Field hockey players at the 1952 Summer Olympics
Field hockey players at the 1956 Summer Olympics
Olympic bronze medallists for Great Britain
Olympic medalists in field hockey
Medalists at the 1952 Summer Olympics